The following is an alphabetically ordered list of notable Latino members of the United States Republican Party, past and present.

A
Alexander Acosta (Former United States Secretary of Labor, former United States Attorney)
Dante Acosta (California State Assembly)
Carlos Alvarez (mayor of Miami-Dade County)
Luis Walter Alvarez (Nobel Prize winning physicist, inventor and professor)
Desi Arnaz (actor, musician, band leader, producer)
Bryan Avila (Florida State Representative)

B
Lee Baca (30th Sheriff of Los Angeles County California)
Alonzo Baldonado (New Mexico State Representative)
Romana Acosta Bañuelos (former U.S. Treasurer, first Latina sub-cabinet official)
José Celso Barbosa (medical doctor, sociologist, political leader; founder of Republican Party of Puerto Rico)
Ruben Barrales (former Deputy Assistant to President George W. Bush, former Director, Office of Intergovernmental Affairs)
Bruno Barreiro (Florida State Representative)
Gustavo Barreiro (Florida State Representative)
Hector Barreto Jr. (former SBA Administrator)
Carlos Bonilla (Lobbyist, adviser to President George W. Bush, senior fellow of the Heritage Foundation
Henry Bonilla (former U.S. Congressman from Texas)
Jaime Bonilla Valdez (joint citizen of Mexico and the United States, he served on Finance Committee of John W. McCain's 2006 Presidential Campaign
Andreas Borgeas (California State Senator)
Luigi Boria (former Mayor of Doral, Florida)
David Borrero (Florida State Representative)
Esteban Bovo (member of the Miami-Dade county commission, former Florida state representative)
George P. Bush (attorney, Commissioner of the Texas General Land Office; son of former Florida Governor Jeb Bush)

C

Anna Escobedo Cabral (former U.S. Treasurer)
Rachael Cabral-Guevara (Wisconsin State Representative)
Demi Cabrera (Florida State Representative)
Rachel Campos-Duffy (former castmate on Real World: San Francisco; wife of former Republican U.S. Representative Sean Duffy)
Francisco Canseco (former U.S. Congressman from Texas)
Al Cardenas (former American Conservative Union chairman)
Rick Carfagna (Ohio State Representative}
John Carona (Texas State Senator)
Leo Carrillo (actor, active in support of Republican Dewey-Bricker ticket and Earl Warren for governor campaign in 1944)
Joe Carollo, (former Mayor of Miami)
Carlos Cascos (former Texas Secretary of State)
Alex Castellanos (Republican media consultant)
Edward Chavez (former Mayor of Stockton, California)
Linda Chavez (political pundit; author)
Rocky Chavez (California State Representative)
Gil Cisneros (current Under Secretary of Defense for Personnel and Readiness)
Jorge Luis Córdova (former Resident Commissioner from Puerto Rico in the U.S. Congress)
Bob Cortes (Florida state representative)
Page Cortez (Louisiana State Senator; former member of the Louisiana House of Representatives)
Rafael Cruz (Protestant minister, active in Ted Cruz campaigns)
Ted Cruz (U.S. Senator from Texas, former Texas Solicitor General)
Mike Curb (musician, record company executive, former Lieutenant Governor of California)
Carlos Curbelo (former U.S. Congressman from Florida)
Baltasar Corrada del Río (former Resident Commissioner from Puerto Rico in the U.S. Congress)
Alessandro Cutrona (Ohio State Representative)

D
Federico Degetau (first Resident Commissioner from Puerto Rico in the U.S. Congress)
José Félix Díaz (Florida State Representative)
Manny Díaz Jr. (Florida State Senator)
Lincoln Díaz-Balart (former U.S. Congressman from Florida)
Mario Díaz-Balart (U.S. Congressman from Florida)
Miguel Díaz de la Portilla (Florida State Senator)
Sergio de la Peña (former Deputy Assistant Secretary of Defense for Western Hemisphere Affairs, Candidate for the Republican nomination for Governor of Virginia in the 2021 election)
Pedro del Valle (retired Lieutenant General, U.S.Marine Corps, unsuccessful candidate for Republican nomination for governor of Maryland]])
Ben Domenech (writer, blogger, editor and television commentator)
Douglas Domenech (Assistant U.S. Secretary of the Interior)

E
Jose Maria Marxuach Echavarria (medical doctor, former mayor of San Juan, Puerto Rico)
Manuel Egozcue Cintron (former mayor of San Juan, Puerto Rico, former member, House of Delegates)
Erik Estrada (actor)
Miguel Estrada (attorney; former federal judicial nominee)

F

Ben Fernandez (political activist, first Latino presidential candidate)
Juan Fernandez-Barquin (Florida State Representative)
Luis A. Ferré (former Governor of Puerto Rico)
Anitere Flores (Florida State Senator)
Bill Flores (U.S. Congressman from Texas)
Mayra Flores (U.S. Congressman from Texas' historically democratic 34th district)
Pete Flores (Texas State Senator)
Luis Fortuño (former Governor of Puerto Rico)
Jeff Frederick (first Latino elected to Virginia government, former Chairman of Republican Party of Virginia)
Nick Fuentes (political activist, podcaster, holds annual America First Political Action Conference)

G

Marilinda Garcia (former New Hampshire state legislator and candidate for the House of Representatives in 2014)
Andy García (actor)
Bianca Garcia (New Hampshire state legislature)
Bonnie Garcia (former California State Assemblywoman and current candidate for California State Senate in 2014)
Ileana Garcia (Florida State Senator)
Michael J. Garcia (Judge of the New York Court of Appeals, former U.S. Attorney for the Southern District of New York)
Mike Garcia (U.S. Representative from California)
Rene Garcia (former Florida State Representative)
Rudy Garcia (Florida State Senator)
John Garza (Texas House of Representatives, District 117-San Antonio)
Tony Garza (former U.S. Ambassador to Mexico)
Carlos Giminez (U.S. Representative from Florida, former Mayor of Miami-Dade County) 
Mario Goico (former Kansas State Representative)
Gabriel Gomez (Republican nominee for Senate in Massachusetts in the 2013 special election)
Alberto Gonzales (80th United States Attorney General)
Tony Gonzales (U.S. Representative for Texas's 23rd district)
Anthony Gonzalez (U.S. Representative from Ohio and football player)
Eduardo Gonzalez (Florida State Representative)
Jenniffer González (Speaker of the Puerto Rico House of Representatives)
Julio Gonzalez (Florida state representative)
Ramon Gonzalez, Jr. (member Kansas House of Representatives)
Virgilio Gonzalez (Anti-Castro activist, Watergate burglar)
Carlos Gutierrez (former Secretary of Commerce)
Lino Gutierrez (former U.S. Ambassador to Argentina)
Marco Gutierrez (co-founder of Latinos for Trump)
Eva Guzman (Justice, Texas Supreme Court, Place 9)

H
Benigno C. Hernandez (Congressman from New Mexico)
Juan Hernandez (Former George W. Bush advisor) 
Shane Hernandez (Michigan State Representative)
Jaime Herrera Beutler (U.S. Congresswoman from Washington State)

I

J
Tirso del Junco (former chair, California Republican Party and former chair, Republican National Hispanic Assembly)

K

L

Raúl Labrador (former U.S. Congressman from Idaho)
Octaviano Ambrosio Larrazolo (first Latino U.S. Senator)
Eric Linder (former California State Assemblyman)
Carlos López-Cantera (former Lieutenant Governor of Florida)
Ed Lopez (National Vice Chairman of the Republican Liberty Caucus and National Committee Member, Young Conservatives for the Freedom to Marry)
Ernesto Lopez (first Latino elected to the Delaware State Senate)
John Lopez IV (Justice of the Arizona Supreme Court since 2016)
Pete Lopez (EPA regional administrator; former New York State Assemblyman)
Manuel Lujan, Jr. (former U.S. Congressman and Secretary of the Interior)

M

Abel Maldonado (former California state senator and Lieutenant Governor of California)
Nicole Malliotakis (U.S. Representative from New York; former State Representative; 2017 candidate for Mayor of New York City)
Rosario Marin (former Treasurer of the United States)
Alfonso Martinez-Fonts Jr. (Assistant Secretary for the Private Sector of the Department of Homeland Security)
Bob Martinez (former Florida Governor)
Eugenio R. Martinez (anti-Castro activist, Watergate burglar)
Matthew Martinez (US Representative from California)
Mel Martinez (former U.S. Senator and former HUD Secretary)
Susana Martinez (first Latina governor in the United States, former Governor of New Mexico, and former District Attorney for New Mexico's 3rd Judicial district)
Suzette Martinez Valladares (California State Assemblywoman)
Lea Márquez Peterson (Member of the Arizona Corporation Commission, Former candidate for congress)
Jason Mattera (Human Events online editor, writer, and political commentator)
Brian Mast (US Representative from Florida) 
Carlos Mayans (former Kansas state representative, former mayor of Wichita, Kansas) 
Melissa Melendez (California State Representative)
Jason Miyares (former Virginia State Delegate and current Virginia Attorney General)
Nestor Montoya (Congressman from New Mexico)
Rod Montoya (New Mexico State Representative)
Alex X. Mooney (former Maryland state senator, former Chairman of the Maryland Republican Party and current Congressman from West Virginia)
Barbara Calandra Moore (former U.S. Ambassador to Nicaragua)
Elsa Murano (former undersecretary for food safety at the U.S. Department of Agriculture)
Carlos Méndez Martínez (Puerto Rican politician and current Mayor of Aguadilla, Puerto Rico)
Miguel A. García Méndez (former Puerto Rican politician and statehood advocate)
Steve Montenegro (Arizona State Senator)
Cathy Muñoz (Alaska State Representative)
Ricardo Montalbán (was a Mexican and American film and television actor)

N
Joe Negron (former Florida State Representative)
Steve Negron (New Hampshire House of Representatives)
Roger Noriega (former Assistant Secretary of State and U.S. Representative to the OAS)
Antonia Coello Novello (former U.S. Surgeon General)
Clarice Navarro (Colorado State House District 47 Representative - Republican)
Jeanette Nuñez (Lieutenant Governor of Florida, former speaker of the Florida House of Representatives)

O
Rosilicie Ochoa Bogh (California State Senator)
Jose R. Oliva (Speaker of the Florida House)
Katherine D. Ortega (former U.S. Treasurer)
Tito Ortiz (mixed martial artist, member of City Council, Huntington Beach, California, mayor pro-tempore)
Adelina Otero-Warren (early 20th century New Mexico suffragist, public official and congressional candidate)
Héctor O'Neill (Mayor of Guaynabo, Puerto Rico)

P
Rolando Pablos (Texas Secretary of State)
Bob Pacheco (former California State Assemblyman)
Rod Pacheco (former California State Assemblyman)
Romualdo Pacheco (first Mexican-American U.S. Congressman and first Latino Governor of the State of California)
Daniel Perez (Florida State Representative) 
Juan-Carlos Planas (Florida State Representative)
Rene Plasencia (Florida state representative)

Q
John Quiñones (former Florida State Representative, Osceola County Commissioner)

R

Carlos Rendo (Mayor of Woodcliff Lake, New Jersey, and 2017 candidate for Lieutenant Governor)
Sean D. Reyes (Utah Attorney General)  
Tomas Pedro Regalado (former Mayor of Miami)
Manuel Requena (former member, Los Angeles Board of Supervisors, former Mayor of Los Angeles, former trustee, Los Angeles Board of Education)
David Rivera (former U.S. Congressman from Florida, former Florida state Representative)
George Rivera (former Colorado State Senator)
Geraldo Rivera (journalist, attorney, author, political commentator, and former television host)
Lionel Rivera (former Mayor of Colorado Springs, Colorado)
Ramon Luis Rivera (former Mayor of Bayamon, Puerto Rico)
Ramon Luis Rivera Jr. (Mayor of Bayamon, Puerto Rico)
Thomas Rivera Schatz (President of the Puerto Rico Senate)
Julio Robaina (Florida State Representative)
Ray Rodrigues (Florida State Representative)
Ana Rodriguez (Florida State Senator)
Anthony Rodriguez (Florida State Representative)
Jessie Rodriguez (Wisconsin State Representative)
Paul Rodriguez (actor)
Rachel Rodriguez-Williams (Wyoming State Representative)
Xavier Rodriguez Judge, United States Court of Appeals for the Fourth Western District of Texas
Cesar Romero (actor, singer, dancer, active in Republican campaigns beginning in 1960)
Ileana Ros-Lehtinen (former U.S. Congresswoman from Florida; first Cuban-American woman in Congress)
Larry Rubin (Mexican-American, President and chairman of The American Society of Mexico, chairman of Republicans Abroad in Mexico
Jeanette Dousdebes Rubio (former Miami Dolphins cheerleader, active in Republican political action committees)
Marco Rubio (U.S. Senator from Florida, former Speaker of the Florida State House of Representatives)

S

Felix Sabates (businessman and philanthropist)
Maria Salazar (U.S. Representative from Florida)
Tim Salazar (Wyoming State Senate)
John Sanchez (former Lieutenant Governor, state representative and gubernatorial nominee in New Mexico)
Leslie Sanchez (political pundit)
Orlando Sanchez (Treasurer of Harris County, Texas)
Brian Sandoval  (former Governor of Nevada, U.S. Attorney and Nevada Attorney General)
Evelyn Sanguinetti (former Lieutenant Governor of Illinois)
Jorge Santini (former Mayor of San Juan, Puerto Rico)
David Santiago (Florida state representative)
Jon Secada (singer and songwriter)
Louis E. Sola (Commissioner of the U.S. Federal Maritime Commission)
Francis X. Suarez, Mayor of Miami
Chris Sununu (Governor of New Hampshire)
John E. Sununu (former United States Senator and Congressman from New Hampshire)
John H. Sununu (former Governor of New Hampshire and White House Chief of Staff)
Libby Szabo (Colorado State Representative)

T
Enrique Tarrio (Florida chairman of Latinos for Trump and chairman of the Proud Boys)
Tito the Builder (Tito Munoz, construction company owner, conservative activist, radio show host, member, Virginia State Board of Housing and Community Development)
Jackie Toledo (Florida State Representative)
Carlos Trujillo (Florida State Representative)

V
Wanda Vázquez Garced (Governor of Puerto Rico)
Jaci Velasquez (singer)
Raul Danny Vargas (businessman, media commentator and political activist)
Eduardo Verastegui (actor, model, singer, anti-abortion activist, presidential adviser)
Barbara Vucanovich (late U.S. Representative from Nevada; first Latina woman elected to Congress)

W

X

Z

See also

 Congressional Hispanic Conference
 List of American conservatives
 List of Latin Americans
 Republican National Hispanic Assembly
 Latino conservatism in the United States

References

External links
 Latino Republicans on Twitter

  
 
 
 
Conservatism-related lists
Lists of American politicians
Republican Party (United States)-related lists